The Ministry of Justice, Prisons Affairs and Constitutional Reforms is the cabinet ministry of the Government of Sri Lanka responsible for the implementation of policies, plans and programmes for the administration of the country's justice system, and thereby administers its courts and prisons. Wijeyadasa Rajapakshe is the incumbent Minister of Justice as of 20 May 2022.

History
The post was established in 1947 under the Soulbury Constitution as one of two fixed ministerial portfolios, the other being the Ministry of Finance. The post took over several functions of the previous colonial post of Legal Secretary. The Soulbury Constitution mandated that the appointee to the post of Minister of Justice should be from the Senate of Ceylon. This provision was removed following the abolishion of the Senate in October 1971. Since 1947, it has been tradition to appoint a lawyer to the post, with a few exceptions.

Roles and responsibility
The ministry does not have oversight of policing, which comes under the Ministry of Defence.

Departments
Department of the Attorney General 
Department of the Legal Draftsman
Department of Public Trustee 
Judicial and Reforms Unit 
Mediation Boards Commission
Law Commission of Sri Lanka
Legal Aid Commission of Sri Lanka
Debt Conciliation Board
National Authority for The Protection of Victims of Crimes and Witnesses
Office of the Registrar of the Supreme Court
Office of the Secretary of Labour Tribunals
Sri Lanka Judge’s Institute
Sri Lanka Law College
Superior Courts Complex Board of Management
Training Schools for Youthful Offenders

Appointments
It also has the authority to appoint individuals to the positions of:
 Justice of the Peace
 Justice of the Peace and Unofficial Magistrate
 Commissioner for Oaths
 Sudden Death Inquirers 
 Sworn Translator

List of ministers
Parties

See also
 Minister of Justice, Prisons Affairs and Constitutional Reforms

References

External links
 Government of Sri Lanka
 Ministry of Justice

Justice
Law of Sri Lanka
Sri Lanka
Sri Lanka, Justice